Lanyon, Lynn & Lanyon, Civil Engineers and Architects was a 19th-century firm working mainly in Dublin and Belfast, and the leading architectural firm in Belfast during the 1860s. Its partners were Charles Lanyon, William Henry Lynn, and Charles' son John Lanyon.

Charles Lanyon was the head of the firm and its most famous architect. In 1854, he took Lynn, his former apprentice, into partnership. Their projects included the "Lombardic" Gothic-style Sinclair Seaman's Presbyterian Church in Belfast, and the Venetian Gothic banks at Newtownards, County Down, and Dungannon, County Tyrone.

Lanyon, Lynn & Lanyon was created when John Lanyon became junior partner in 1860. The partnership with Lynn was dissolved in 1872.

Projects
Designs for buildings and other projects by Lanyon, Lynn & Lanyon include:

Sources
 Gillian McClelland and Diana Hadden, Pioneering Women: Riddel Hall and Queen's University Belfast (Ulster Historical Foundation, 2005), p. 193 online.
 Antonia Brody, Directory of British Architects 1834-1914: L-Z (Continuum International Publishing Group, 2001), pp. 15–16 and 89 online.

 Dictionary of Scottish Architects, Architect Biography Report, Lanyon, Lynn & Lanyon

References

Architecture firms of Northern Ireland
Architecture firms of Ireland